The Institute of Current World Affairs (ICWA) is an operating foundation established in 1925 by US industrial heir and magnate Charles Richard Crane to advance American understanding of international cultures and affairs by sending young professionals abroad to study countries, regions and globally important issues. Institute alumni include leading journalists, scholars, diplomats, activists and businesspeople.

ICWA says it selects its fellows from a diverse group of young professionals for two years of cultural immersion in locations around the globe. Fellows explore their topics through self-designed and fully funded programs of study, thought and writing. They record their research and analysis in monthly dispatches.

While in the field, fellows receive support and mentoring from ICWA staff, former fellows and ICWA members with expertise in fellowship areas.

Former fellows credit the intensive immersion experience of an ICWA fellowship, free from deadlines and career pressures, with enabling them to cultivate their talent and engage with their subject in ways that have a profound impact.

The Institute of Current World Affairs is recognized as a tax-exempt organization under Section 501(c)(3) of the Internal Revenue Code.

Purpose and recent history
The Institute of Current World Affairs supports fellowships for promising young people to gain in-depth understanding of global affairs from a local perspective. ICWA says it chooses candidates with the potential to make substantial contributions to public life in the United States.

The institute, which pays living expenses for fellows and their families, has sent more than 170 people abroad through its fellowship program.

In addition to publishing fellows' dispatches on its website, ICWA also offers analysis and commentary on global news and other developments. 
It also produces two podcasts: The Cable, which addresses threats to democracy in Europe and the transatlantic relationship, and From the Field, which takes listeners around the world with ICWA fellows studying cultures and societies in depth. In October 2020, ICWA launched a partnership with U.S. online magazine Slate to offer select fellow dispatches for publication.

Alumni
The Institute of Current World Affairs has supported individuals who go on to notable careers that leverage the expertise learned during the fellowship, especially in the fields of journalism, academia and public service.

The work of the Institute's fellows has appeared in numerous national publications, including The New York Times, the Washington Post, Bloomberg Businessweek, The New Yorker, and elsewhere. Fellows have published dozens of books and appeared across media outlets as country experts.

The fellowships are credited with launching the careers of notable writers, leaders and foreign policy experts, including:

Julie Barlow, a Canadian journalist, author and conference speaker who writes and publishes both in English and French and is based in Montreal, Quebec.
 David Binder (February 22, 1931 – June 30, 2019), a British-born American journalist, author and lecturer. He resided in Evanston, Illinois, after spending most of his adult life in Washington, D.C., Germany and Serbia.
 L. Carl Brown, American academic and former Garrett Professor in Foreign Affairs, Emeritus, and professor of Near Eastern studies, emeritus, at Princeton University.
 Nancy Condee, a professor at the University of Pittsburgh in the Department of Slavic Languages and Literatures who served as the head of the Cultural Studies department from 1995 to 2006. Her field is contemporary Russian cinema and cultural politics.
 William Fulbright Foote, CEO and founder of Root Capital, a nonprofit organization operating in poor rural areas of Africa, Latin America, and Southeast Asia. According to its website, Root Capital "seeks to maximize the positive social and environmental impact of [its] work through a three-pronged strategy: finance, advise, and catalyze."
 Thomas Goltz, an American author and journalist best known for his accounts of conflict in the Caucasus region during the 1990s.
 Suzy Hansen, New York Times journalist (Turkey, 2007–2009), whose  book, Notes on a Foreign Country, was a 2018 Pulitzer Prize finalist. 
  Smith Hempstone, the former U.S. ambassador to Kenya
 Pramila Jayapal (India, 1994–1996), a civil-rights activist turned U.S. Representative from Washington's 7th congressional district
 Cheng Li (China, 1993–1995) is author of Rediscovering China: Dynamics and Dilemmas of Reform, as well as the Director of the John L. Thornton China Center and Senior Fellow at Brookings Institution.
 Ann Mische, an American sociologist and Associate Professor of Sociology at the University of Notre Dame and a Professor of Peace Studies at the Kroc Institute for International Peace Studies. She is particularly known for her contributions to political sociology, relational sociology, social networks, and contentious politics.
 Paul Anthony Rahe (born December 18, 1948), an American classicist, historian, writer and professor of history at Hillsdale College. He taught at Yale University, Cornell University, Franklin and Marshall College, and the University of Tulsa before taking up his present position.
 Carol Rose (South and Central Asia, 1990–1993) is now executive director of ACLU Massachusetts. 
  Nicolas Schmidle, a writer for the New Yorker. As an ICWA fellow in Pakistan in January 2008, Schmidle wrote a Sunday magazine article for The New York Times titled "Next Gen Taliban." He was deported by Pakistan's government the day after the article appeared.
 Jeffrey Steingarten, the Food Critic at Vogue magazine, for which he has won a National Magazine Award and a dozen James Beard awards and nominations. He is also the author of the best-selling The Man Who Ate Everything and It Must've Been Something I Ate. The Man Who Ate Everything was named food book of the year by the British Guild of Food Writers and awarded the 1998 Julia Child Book Award for literary food writing. Jeffrey's pieces have also appeared in The New York Times, Men's Vogue and Slate magazine. He appears regularly on Food Network.
 Susan Sterner, Brazil, 1998–2000) who documented First Lady Laura Bush as a White House photographer. 
 Phillips Talbot, the former assistant secretary of state for Near Eastern and South Asian affairs,
 Andrew Weil, an American celebrity doctor who advocates for alternative medicine including the 4-7-8 breathing technique.

Current Fellows

Recent Past Fellows

Current ICWA Board of Trustees

References

External links
Institute of Current World Affairs

Non-profit organizations based in Washington, D.C.
Organizations established in 1925
1925 establishments in Washington, D.C.